363 (three hundred [and] sixty-three) is the natural number following 362 and preceding 364.

In mathematics
 It is an odd, composite, positive, real integer, composed of a prime (3) and a prime squared (112).
 363 is a deficient number and a perfect totient number.
 363 is a palindromic number in bases 3, 10, 11 and 32.
 363 is a repdigit (BB) in base 32.
 The Mertens function returns 0.
 Any subset of its digits is divisible by three.
 363 is the sum of nine consecutive primes (23 + 29 + 31 + 37 + 41 + 43 + 47 + 53 + 59).
 363 is the sum of five consecutive powers of 3 (3 + 9 + 27 + 81 + 243).
 363 can be expressed as the sum of three squares in four different ways: 112 + 112 + 112, 52 + 72 + 172, 12 + 12 + 192, and 132 + 132 + 52.
 363 cubits is the solution given to Rhind Mathematical Papyrus question 50 – find the side length of an octagon with the same area as a circle 9 khet in diameter .

References

Integers